TCK has several meanings:

 Third Culture Kid, a term in sociology describing children who grow up in cultures other than those of their parents.
 Technology Compatibility Kit, for Java programming language
 Tecktonik, a form of dance
 Teck Resources, NYSE stock symbol is TCK
 General Directorate of Highways (Turkey) abbreviation
 A type of thermocouple